Piero Mentasti (15 May 1897 – 24 September 1958) was a member of the Italian Christian Democracy, and was an Italian Senator from Lombardy. He did not seek re-election in 1953. 35 of his essays on liberalism are compiled in On Liberal Revolution.

Political career
Mentasti was appointed to the Provisional National Council of Italy in 1945, and he was elected to the Constituent Assembly in 1946. He obtained the election to the Italian Senate in 1948, serving until 1953.

Role in the Senate

Committee assignments
Committee on Trade and Industry
Legislature I

Electoral history
1948 election for the Italian Senate
Direct mandate for Treviglio (72.7%) obtaining the landslide victory required by law (more than 2/3 of votes)

See also
Italian Senate election in Lombardy, 1948

Footnotes

External links
senato.it

1897 births
1958 deaths
Members of the Italian Senate from Lombardy
Christian Democracy (Italy) politicians
20th-century Italian politicians
Members of the Senate of the Republic (Italy)